Diego Martínez may refer to:

 Diego Martínez de Villamayor (died 1176), noble of the Kingdom of Castile
 Diego Martínez Barrio (1883–1962), Spanish politician
 Diego Martínez Torrón (born 1950), professor of Spanish literature

Association football
 Diego Martínez (footballer, born 1978), Argentine retired footballer and manager
 Diego Martínez (Paraguayan footballer, born 1980), Paraguayan footballer
 Diego Martínez (Spanish footballer, born 1980), Spanish footballer and football manager
 Diego Martínez (Mexican footballer, born 1981), Mexican footballer
 Diego Martínez (Uruguayan footballer, born 1981), Uruguayan footballer
 Diego Martínez (footballer, born 1984), Argentine footballer
 Diego Martínez (footballer, born 1988), Mexican footballer
 Dieguito (footballer, born 1989), Spanish footballer
 Diego Martínez (footballer, born 1992), Argentine footballer
 Diego Martínez (footballer, born 1993), Mexican footballer